Colletotrichum pisi is a plant pathogen.

References

External links

pisi
Fungal plant pathogens and diseases
Fungi described in 1891